Leaf is an Israeli company that manufactures high-end digital backs for medium format and large format cameras. It was previously a division of Scitex and later Kodak, and is now a subsidiary of Phase One. In 1991, Leaf introduced the first medium format digital camera back, the Leaf DCB1, nicknamed ‘The Brick’, which had a resolution of 4 million pixels (4 megapixels). As of 2012, Leaf produces the Credo line of digital camera backs, ranging from 40 to 80 megapixels. Until 2010, Leaf also produced photography workflow software Leaf Capture.

Products

Digital camera backs
After Leaf's DCB, the digital backs evolved into two product lines, the Aptus and the (now discontinued) Valeo. The main difference is that the Aptus models have a 3.5-inch touchscreen, where the Valeos have no on-board display. The Valeos can still be used untethered by using the DP-67 software or the more recent WiView software on a Compaq iPAQ. The iPAQs are connected via Bluetooth with the digital backs. For untethered usage, you will need battery packs for both the Aptus and the Valeo, otherwise the back must be powered via a FireWire connection to a computer. The Valeo models need a Leaf Digital Magazine as well for untethered use, where the Aptus models have a Compact Flash slot.

Current models
Credo is the current generation of digital camera backs from Leaf, and the first Leaf back based on Phase One platform and not Leaf legacy platforms.
Some of the changes are that the back no longer has a cooling fan, but instead makes use of passive cooling.
Also to be noted is the new hi res capacitive touch screen which no longer require stylus pen.
The back also boots in one second with Phase One OS. Previous Windows CE operating system took up to 10 seconds to reboot.

The differences between Credo and Aptus II:
 Interface: Credo has both FW800 and USB3 interfaces. Aptus II has only FW800 interface. Aptus uses a proprietary L shaped FW connector, while Credo uses a straight regular connector. Thick head connectors will not fit into either backs. Credo uses standard USB3 type B connector and standard cables may be used. Officially only 3 meter USB3 cables are supported, but 5 and 7.5 meters were tested and worked with repeaters. FW cables in Credo and Aptus are supported up to 10 meters.
 Battery: Credo uses an internal battery, and Aptus uses an external battery. Credo can't operate without a charged battery inside it. When Aptus is tethered it can work only without battery, as the battery port and cable port are overlapping. The Credo battery is charged when using powered FW800, but not when using USB. It is possible to use low powered Windows tablets to tether Credo, while Aptus generally requires tethering to a laptop which has a FW port that is powered from AC. Aptus can load a double capacity and size battery, which Credo can't, since the battery goes into a slot in the Credo body.
 Screen: Credo has a smaller screen but with more resolution. Credo has capacitive touch screen (more sensitive like current smart phones), and Aptus has a resistive touch screen (less sensitive, like older PDAs)
 Connection protocols: Credo is much faster to connect in tethering than Aptus, and establishes a more stable connection.
 Colors: Credo colors are more accurate and less punchy and unique than Aptus colors.
 Sensitivity - Credo is 1/3 stop more sensitive to light than Aptus, using the same ISO settings.
 Body compatibility: Aptus can work on all 645 Mamiya models from AFD and upwards. Credo requires 645DF and upwards, and can work with 645AFD III only when version 1 of the firmware is installed on it. Interfacing to non Mamiya 645 bodies, such a RZ67, HY6, Hasselblad H/V, Contax, tech cameras is unchanged from Aptus.
 Long exposures: Credo can do much longer exposures than Aptus with acceptable noise.
 Noise: Credo has slightly less noise in high ISO than Aptus in normal length exposures.
 File format: Credo produces IIQ files same as Phase One backs. There are two types of files: large and small. Large has no compression and small has some compression and about half the size. The "Large" files can be opened by Adobe Photoshop and Lightroom. IIQ files are not compatible with Leaf Capture.
 Live view: Credo has live view on the back's screen - Aptus has live view only on tethered computer. Since both live views are CCD based, they are significantly inferior to live views on current CMOS sensors.
 All ports in the Credo body are covered ("weather sealed").
 Credo body is made of metal, Aptus has plastic/metal combination. Credo has a metal heatsink, while Aptus has a cooling fan, which makes some noise and can make the back freeze in icy winds.
 Aptus has a detachable LCD protector cover which Credo does not have.
 Turning on/off: Tethered Aptus automatically turns on when the computer is turned on, and autocratically turns off when the computer is turned off. Credo must be turned on and off manually, and also turns off automatically after a period of idle time.

Aptus II models are very similar to corresponding previous Aptus models, with the notable differences:
 Live view available with Phase One 645AF and 645DF bodies (+ Mamiya AFD III & DF), no dongle required. Live view is available on Capture One with large format bodies for legacy Aptus 22 and up, Live View dongle is no longer required.
 Camera controls (aperture, shutter speed and shutter release) on Phase One 645AF and 645DF bodies (+ Mamiya AFD III & DF)
 Faster shooting speed, shot-to-shot and faster transmission to tethered computer
 FireWire 800 connection replaces FireWire 400
 Slightly different color response

The following table shows the models which Leaf still shows on their website as current models.

Discontinued Models

Camera Mounts
The Aptus-II models are equipped with a specific mount to fit one of the following camera systems:

It is impossible to convert the mount of a digital back for a different medium format body via adapter or conversion plates, because the sensor would then not sit within the film plane (since the sensor needs to sit the same distance from the lens that the film would). Such conversion may be possible by sending the back to Leaf to be physically reconfigured, depending on the specific model.

Any mount can be used on view cameras by using the correct adapter plate, for example: Alpha, Arca, Cambo, Horseman, Kata, Linhof, Sinar, Toyo, Rollei X-Act2, and other via Leaf Graflok or third party adapters.  This is because view cameras have an adjustable focal plane.

The AFI backs (in the Discontinued Models) are specifically designed to work with Sinar and Rollei systems.

Accessories

Leaf Digital Magazine
The Leaf Digital Magazine, or LDM, is a portable, small FireWire-powered hard drive that enables a digital back lacking a Compact Flash slot to be used untethered. There are three models, the 5GB, 10 GB and 20 GB. It can be mounted in the U-bracket, which can also contain two (smaller than normal) batteries. This U-bracket can then be mounted underneath the camera. There are short FireWire cables available to connect the LDM to the Leaf digital back.

Software

Capture One / Capture One Pro

Capture One is a tethering software, Raw image format converter and workflow software which enables photographers to deliver ready-to-use images with adjusted color and detail. It is designed to create very high image quality and provides a series of tools created to match the professional photographer's daily workflow. Capture One replaced Leaf Capture as tethering and processing software for all Leaf Aptus and Aptus II backs.

Leaf Capture
Image capture workflow software, available for Apple Inc. OS X and Microsoft Windows. Leaf capture is no longer developed, and is Replaced by Capture One for all Aptus and Aptus II models.
 Image comparison
 Camera control (of non-manual cameras)
 Loupe tool, focus preview
 Realtime live view display
 Grid and layout overlay
 Color temperature and tint sliders
 Adjustable histogram
 Moiré removal tool
Note: From v11.2.9 on only supports Aptus models

Leaf Capture Remote App / Server
Used together, allows browsing of your "Shots" folder on wireless devices (iPad, iPod Touch and iPhone).  The app works via the device's wireless local area network connection with Leaf Capture Server running on a host computer

Leaf WiView
Leaf WiView is an update of the DP-67 software. It is an application that enables you to have wireless control (via Bluetooth) over your Leaf imaging module to view and edit images on an HP iPAQ Pocket PC as you shoot.
 Known supported iPAQ models: hx2100, hx2400, hx2700, hx4700, rx5900, 110, 210.
 Known supported Leaf models: Valeo 17wi, Valeo 22wi, ...

Leaf DP-67
The Leaf DP-67 application on an HP iPAQ allows wireless remote communication with the Leaf Valeo digital camera back via Bluetooth.
The advantages of large storage space for your images and full control over the capture process are maintained by the Leaf Digital Magazine and Leaf DP-67 (iPAQ) display and control devices.

References

External links

Photography companies of Israel
Digital camera backs
Kfar Saba